The United Nations has played an advisory role in maintaining peace and order in the Kashmir region soon after the independence and partition of British India into the dominions of Pakistan and India in 1947, when a dispute erupted between the two new States on the question of accession over the princely state of Jammu and Kashmir. India took this matter to the UN Security Council, which passed resolution 39 (1948) and established the United Nations Commission for India and Pakistan (UNCIP) to investigate the issues and mediate between the two new countries. Following the cease-fire of hostilities, it also established the United Nations Military Observer Group in India and Pakistan (UNMOGIP) to monitor the cease-fire line.

Overview

1948–1951 
Following the outbreak of the Indo-Pakistani War of 1947, India's Governor General Mountbatten flew to Lahore on 1 November 1947 for a conference with Muhammad Ali Jinnah, proposing that, in all the princely States where the ruler did not accede to a Dominion corresponding to the majority population (which would have included Junagadh, Hyderabad as well Kashmir), the accession should be decided by an 'impartial reference to the will of the people'. Jinnah rejected the offer. The Prime Ministers Jawaharlal Nehru and Liaquat Ali Khan met again in December, where Nehru informed Khan of India's intention to refer the dispute to the United Nations under article 35 (Chapter VI) of the UN Charter, which allows the member states to bring to the Security Council attention situations `likely to endanger the maintenance of international peace'.

India sought resolution of the issue at the UN Security Council (UNSC) on 1 January 1948. Following the set-up of the United Nations Commission for India and Pakistan (UNCIP), the UN Security Council passed Resolution 47 on 21April 1948. The measure imposed an immediate cease-fire and called on the Government of Pakistan 'to secure the withdrawal from the state of Jammu and Kashmir of tribesmen and Pakistani nationals not normally resident therein who have entered the state for the purpose of fighting.' It also asked Government of India to reduce its forces to minimum strength, after which the circumstances for holding a plebiscite should be put into effect 'on the question of Accession of the state to India or Pakistan.' However, it was not until 1 January 1949 that the ceasefire could be put into effect, signed by General Gracey on behalf of Pakistan and General Roy Bucher on behalf of India.

The UNCIP made three visits to the subcontinent between 1948 and 1949, trying to find a solution agreeable to both India and Pakistan. It reported to the Security Council in August 1948 that "the presence of troops of Pakistan" inside Kashmir represented a "material change" in the situation. A two-part process was proposed for the withdrawal of forces. In the first part, Pakistan was to withdraw its forces as well as other Pakistani nationals from the state. In the second part, "when the Commission shall have notified the Government of India" that Pakistani withdrawal has been completed, India was to withdraw the bulk of its forces. After both the withdrawals were completed, a plebiscite would be held. The resolution was accepted by India but effectively rejected by Pakistan.

The Indian government considered itself to be under legal possession of Jammu and Kashmir by virtue of the accession of the state. The assistance given by Pakistan to the rebel forces and the Pakhtoon tribes was held to be a hostile act and the further involvement of the Pakistan army was taken to be an invasion of Indian territory. From the Indian perspective, the plebiscite was meant to confirm the accession, which was in all respects already complete, and Pakistan could not aspire to an equal footing with India in the contest.

The Pakistan government held that the state of Jammu and Kashmir had executed a Standstill Agreement with Pakistan which precluded it from entering into agreements with other countries. It also held that the Maharaja had no authority left to execute accession because his people had revolted and he had to flee the capital. It believed that the Azad Kashmir movement as well as the tribal incursions were indigenous and spontaneous, and Pakistan's assistance to them was not open to criticism.

In short, India required an asymmetric treatment of the two countries in the withdrawal arrangements regarding Pakistan as an 'aggressor', whereas Pakistan insisted on parity. The UN mediators tended towards parity, which was not to India's satisfaction. In the end, no withdrawal was ever carried out, India insisting that Pakistan had to withdraw first, and Pakistan contending that there was no guarantee that India would withdraw afterwards. No agreement could be reached between the two countries on the process of demilitarisation.

Scholars have commented that the failure of the Security Council efforts of mediation owed to the fact that the council regarded the issue as a purely political dispute without investigating its legal underpinnings.

1951–1957 
The India-Pakistan question was not a part of the agenda for the UNSC from 1953 and 1957. During this period, both India and Pakistan made internal decisions that worsened each other's perception of the other's stance on Kashmir. Pakistan became a part of the military alliances Southeast Asia Treaty Organization (SEATO) and Central Treaty Organisation (CENTO). India saw nationalist movements from 1954 onwards. Organizations such as Bhartiya Jana Sangha demanded integration. The main trigger for Pakistan to appeal to the UNSC was the adoption of the Constitution of Jammu and Kashmir in November 1956 which stated "The State of Jammu and Kashmir is and will be a part of Union of India".

1962–1972 
Through a letter on 1 January 1962 Pakistan asked for a meeting of the UNSC. Shortly after, India said that such a meeting was not required. This continued until the UNSC eventually held discussions on the India-Pakistan question on 1 February 1962 and between 27 April and 22 June 1962. Following the Second Kashmir War, India and Pakistan signed the Tashkent Declaration. The Tashkent Declaration by-passed the United Nations and was brokered by the Soviet Union. The liberation of Bangladesh and 1972 Simla Agreement made India harden its stance on aversion to United Nations mediation on Kashmir.

1972–present 
1972 onwards, UNSC no longer passed any resolution on the India-Pakistan question. Pakistan independently and through bodies such as the Organisation of Islamic Cooperation, continues to raise the issue at the United Nations General Assembly. The Office of the United Nations High Commissioner for Human Rights, and UN Secretary General over the years have commented upon the issue. The OHCHR came out with two reports in 2018 and 2019.

The UNMOGIP is still functional. According to the secretary-general the UNMOGIP can only be abolished through a UNSC decision.

Following the revocation of the special status of Jammu and Kashmir, the UNSC discussed the Kashmir question at least three times. However no resolutions was taken and no statement issued.

Mediatory reports
Mediatory reports include:

 UNCIP: 4
 Andrew McNaughton, Owen Dixon, Gunnar Jarring: 1 each
 Frank Graham: 6

McNaughton proposals

In December 1949 the Canadian president of the UNSC, General McNaughton, was requested by the council to approach the two states to solve the dispute. McNaughton issued both states on 22 December with his proposals and two days before his term as president of the council was to expire he reported back to the UNSC, on 29 December. But the council asked him to continue his mediation and he did so, submitting his final report on 3 February 1950.

His proposal enclosed a scheme whereby Pakistan and India would simultaneously withdraw their regular forces (excluding those Indian regular forces needed for security purposes). The Azad Kashmir forces and Kashmir State forces (and other militia) would both be demobilized. The Northern Areas would also be dimilitarised and its administration would remain with the local authorities, under UN supervision. Pakistan accepted his suggestions but India proposed two far-reaching amendments which amounted to a rejection.

The proposals treated India and Pakistan as equal participants in the dispute which was not acceptable to India. In India's view, Pakistan was present illegally in Kashmir while India was present legally. The United States warned India that it would have no option but to comply with any decision that the Security Council may opt for because by rejecting the McNaugton proposals it would be the third successive time India spurned the conclusions of a neutral UN representative, upon which Nehru accused the US of pressurizing his government. India's rejections of the McNaugton proposals were viewed by American policymakers as an example of Indian "intransigence."

The McNaughton proposals were popular in the Security Council, which then passed a resolution giving both states a time period of five months to arrange the demilitarisation scheme. India later accepted the draft resolution on 14 March 1950. The council then appointed Sir Owen Dixon as the next UN representative to the two countries; and he was tasked with administering McNaughton's demilitarisation scheme, which India had already rejected.

Dixon mission

On the Pakistani side of the ceasefire line, Sir Owen Dixon proposed that the areas demilitarized by Pakistan would be governed by the local authorities under supervision by the commission, according to the "law and custom" of the State before the conflict started. India opposed this idea because it believed that the local authorities were biased in Pakistan's favour and this would not be in India's interests. However, India did not offer any substitute ideas.

On the Indian side of the ceasefire line, Dixon proposed attaching a United Nations officer with each district magistrate who would be allowed to inspect and report on the magistrate's reports and proceedings. Nehru objected to this idea by claiming that it would intrude on the state's sovereignty. Nehru again offered no alternative idea.

Next, Dixon put before the prime ministers of the two countries some proposals such as establishing a coalition government between Sheikh Abdullah and Ghulam Abbas or distributing the portfolios between the various parties. Dixon's second suggestion was to establish a neutral government by respectable non-political people for a six-month period prior to a referendum, in which membership would be split between Hindus and Muslims equally, under United Nations supervision. Dixon's third suggestion was to install an administrative body made up completely of representatives from the UN. Nehru disagreed with all these suggestions. Sir Owen Dixon criticized India for its negative reactions to all the demilitarization proposals. Sir Owen Dixon took India to task in very strong language for its negative reactions to the various alternative proposals for demilitarisation.

Dixon next asked Nehru in the presence of the Pakistani Prime Minister whether it would be advisable to have plebiscites by region and allocate each region according to the results of a plebiscite in each. India reacted favourably to this plan. According to the Indian commentator Raghavan, it was first Nehru who proposed a partition-cum-plebiscite plan: Jammu and Ladakh would go to India, Azad Kashmir and Northern Areas to Pakistan, and a plebiscite would be held in the Kashmir Valley. Dixon favoured the plan, which bears his name till this day. Dixon agreed that people in Jammu and Ladakh were clearly in favour of India; equally clearly, those in Azad Kashmir and the Northern Areas wanted to be part of Pakistan. This left the Kashmir Valley and 'perhaps some adjacent country' around Muzaffarabad in uncertain political terrain. However, according to Dixon, Pakistan "bluntly rejected" the proposal. It believed that the plebiscite should be held in the entire state or the state should be partitioned along religious lines. Pakistan believed that India's commitment to a plebiscite for the whole of Jammu and Kashmir should not be departed from.

Dixon also had concerns that the Kashmiris, not being high-spirited people, may vote under fear or improper influences. Following Pakistan's objections, he proposed that Sheikh Abdullah administration should be held in "commission" (in abeyance) while the plebiscite was held. This was not acceptable to India. According to Raghavan, at this point, Dixon lost patience and declared failure.

Another reason India declined Dixon's proposals for a limited plebiscite was that India wanted to keep its own troops in Kashmir during the plebiscite, claiming they were necessary for "security reasons", but at the same time India did not want any Pakistani troops to remain. This contradicted the Dixon plan which had stipulated that neither India nor Pakistan would be permitted to retain troops in the plebiscite zone.

Dixon felt that India would not agree to demilitarisation and other provisions governing the plebiscite that guard against influence and abuse. In the absence of Indian demilitarization, the Pakistanis and the Azad forces were unwilling to demilitarise the territory under their administration. Dixon's final comment was to suggest that India and Pakistan be left to solve the situation on their own.

The failure of the Dixon mission served to increase the American ambassador Loy Henderson's distrust of India. Henderson in his own assessment upon visiting the Kashmir Valley observed that the majority of people in the Valley would vote to join Pakistan in a plebiscite rather than remain with India. He observed that if given the choice, most Kashmiris would opt for a third option: independence. Henderson believed that because of Indian allegations, kindled by Nehru, that America was biased in favour of Pakistan, the Americans ought to distance themselves from the Kashmir dispute, which Washington did so in 1950.

Frank Graham's mediation

Pakistan vetoed Ralph Bunche as the next mediator.

When Dixon's successor, Dr Frank Graham, arrived in the subcontinent during a time of tension, he tried to effect demilitarisation prior to a plebiscite but India and Pakistan could not agree on the number of troops who were to remain in Kashmir.

Dr Frank Graham was appointed by the Security Council as the UN representative for India and Pakistan on 30 April 1951. Dr Graham arrived in the subcontinent on 30 June 1951. The Graham mission had to reach an agreement between the two countries concerning the demilitarisation of Kashmir. Similar to the experience of previous UN representatives,  Graham had first proposed a demilitarisation scheme which found acceptance from Pakistan but rejection from India. Thereafter, Graham gave an alternative proposal whereby both countries were to gradually reduce their forces to minimal levels and to the ratio of their presence in the state on 1 January 1949. This proposal was accepted by Pakistan but rejected by India.

Dr Graham offered a fresh set of proposals on 16 July 1952. By them Pakistan would reduce its forces to a quantity between 3,000 and 6,000 and India would reduce its troops numbers to between 12,000 and 16,000. But the state militias on the Indian side and the Gilgit and Northern Scouts on Pakistan's side were not included in these figures. Because Pakistan was hopeful for a plebiscite it accepted this plan but India did not accept it, perhaps because the question of irregular forces was not solved.  Graham revised the figures so that 6,000 would be the limit of Pakistan's forces and 18,000 would be the limit for India's forces. The response of India was to propose that it be allowed to keep 21,000 troops (including the state militia) in its side but that Pakistan be allowed only a 4,000 strong civilian force. Dr Graham reported his failure to the Security Council, which subsequently passed a resolution in December 1951 calling for India and Pakistan to come to an agreement on reducing the size of their forces. The resolution requested Pakistan to reduce its military presence to 3,000-6,000 and that India to cut its own troop numbers to a number between 12,000 and 18,000. The Security Council urged both countries to consider Dr Graham's criterion for troop reductions which he had suggested on 4 September 1951. Pakistan agreed to the Security Council resolution but India did not and gave no reason for its rejection.

Graham then tried to make the mediation move forward and, without proposing a parallel increase of Pakistani forces, gave a proposal which would allow India to keep 21,000 troops as had been India's demand. This proposal was also unsuccessful. Dr Graham submitted a second report to the United Nations in December to recount the failure of his endeavors to achieve a demilitarisation for a plebiscite. His third submission to the UN in April 1952 relayed some headway on the demilitarisation question as both countries had begun withdrawing forces since March. But by the fourth report in October 1952 Graham had to inform the Security Council that the negotiations had stumbled again over the question of the size and type of forces to be permitted for both sides. The Security Council then adopted a resolution asking that the two nations hold direct talks over this question. There were talks in February 1953 in Geneva but the UN representative realised that this method would be unsuccessful. On 27 March 1953 Dr Graham presented his final report and his mediatory efforts ended. The two questions during this mediation which India and Pakistan differed upon was the number of troops to remain after demilitarisation on each side and when the plebiscite administrator could assume their tasks.

United Nations Military Observer Group in India and Pakistan

The Security Council Resolution 47 (1948) also enlarged the membership of the UNCIP to 5 members. India and Pakistan signed the Karachi Agreement in July 1949 and established a ceasefire line to be supervised by observers. After the termination of the UNCIP, the Security Council passed Resolution 91 (1951) and established a United Nations Military Observer Group in India and Pakistan (UNMOGIP) to observe and report violations of ceasefire.

After the Indo-Pakistani War of 1971, the two countries signed the Simla Agreement in 1972 to define the Line of Control in Kashmir. India and Pakistan disagree on UNMOGIP's mandate in Kashmir because India argued that the mandate of UNMOGIP has lapsed after the Simla agreement because it was specifically established to observe ceasefire according to the Karachi Agreement.

However, the secretary-general of the United Nations maintained that the UNMOGIP should continue to function because no resolution has been passed to terminate it. India has partially restricted the activities of the unarmed 45 UN observers on the Indian side of the Line of Control on the grounds that the mandate of UNMOGIP has lapsed.

Gallery

See also 
 UN Security Council resolutions concerning the Kashmir conflict: Resolution 38, 39, 47, 51, 80, 91, 98, 122, 123, 126, 209, 210, 211, 214, 215, 303, 307
 Kashmir conflict
OHCHR reports on Kashmir
United Nations fact-finding mission

References

Bibliography
 
 

—

 
 

 

 
—

External links
United Nations Military Observer Group in India and Pakistan
UN Security Council Resolution 39 and 47
BBC Timeline on Kashmir conflict
The Case of UN Involvement in Jammu and Kashmir
Index to Proceeding to the General Assembly 1995/1996
The United Nations: Friend Or Foe of Self-Determination?

Kashmir
Diplomacy regarding the Kashmir conflict
Guerrilla wars
India and the United Nations
Pakistan and the United Nations
India and Pakistan